Big Al's may refer to:

 Big Al's
 Big Al's (bowling alley)
 Big Al Brewing